Nancy Valen is an American actress and television producer. She is best known for portraying Captain Samantha Thomas on Baywatch.

Early life
 
Nancy Valen was born in Brooklyn, New York and raised in Hallandale, Florida. By the time she was 12 years old, she was spending summers modeling in New York City and studied acting at Uta Hagen's HB Studios. After graduating from Dillard High School of Performing Arts, a magnet program in Ft. Lauderdale, Florida, Valen won a theatrical scholarship to the University of Florida. She ultimately declined the scholarship in favor of continuing her professional career in Miami. Meanwhile, she attended Broward Community College, where she studied theatre and paid for her tuition by modeling and acting, appearing in two episodes of Miami Vice.

After one year of college, Valen went to New York City to pursue a theatrical career. Within one month of being in New York, she landed a series regular role on the daytime drama Ryan's Hope. Valen stayed with Ryan's Hope for two years before moving to Los Angeles to pursue other interests.

Career

Acting
Valen made her film debut in Porky's Revenge (1985), followed by a role in The Heavenly Kid with Richard Mulligan and Jane Kaczmarek. In 1989, Valen co-starred alongside Patrick Dempsey in the film, Loverboy. She also had a small role opposite Kirk Cameron in the film Listen to Me. Her other film appearances include Seven Sundays alongside Molly Ringwald; directed by Academy Award-winning director, Jean-Charles Tacchella.

In addition to films, Valen has also appeared in various television series. In 1990, she guest starred in an episode of Saved by the Bell as the brand new school nurse at Bayside High, Jennifer. Before  Valen was cast as Nurse Jennifer, supermodel Kathy Ireland was going to play the part. Ireland was however ultimately fired during rehearsals after a disappointing table read and a similarly disappointing dress rehearsal. "She must have dazzled us in the office, because I hired her on the spot," recalled co-creator Peter Engel. Engel soon called Ireland's manager to inform him that she would not be playing the part.

That same year, she co-starred in NBC's short-lived musical series Hull High under the direction of Kenny Ortega. After the series premiere, TV Guide proclaimed her "the most agreeably watchable new star on TV". Valen has also guest starred on 23 series including Hardball, CSI: Crime Scene Investigation, Friends, Spin City, Boy Meets World, Full House, Charles in Charge, Miami Vice, Silk Stalkings, and Murder She Wrote.

Valen has also hosted several infomercials for the Bun and Thigh Roller, Slam Man, Thin 'n Sexy Body Wrap, Kevin Trudeau's Debt Cures "They" Don't Want You To Know About, Time Life The Heart of Classic Rock, and the Instyler. Valen has also starred in commercials for John Deere and Washington Mutual

Valen has appeared as a guest on Leno, The Oprah Winfrey Show, Good Day L.A. and on the covers and pages of magazines and newspapers including American Women, FHM, Cosmopolitan, Entertainment Weekly, and The Los Angeles Times Calendar.

Producing
Valen, alongside Craig J. Nevius, formed Windmill Entertainment. Among the television programs she has produced include Living in TV Land, Chasing Farrah, William Shatner in Concert, and Let's Kill Scott Baio.

As an Executive Producer/reality series creator, Valen has partnered with a wide variety of companies including Whoop Inc., Renegade83, 44 Blue, Target, and Intuitive Entertainment. Valen later partnered with Authentic Entertainment on the series WHEN STAMIE MET TRACY. The series follows two former The Real L Word stars as they raise their three children with their extended modern family. In addition, Valen works with Jarrett Creative Group in partnership with the Biography Channel for the networks’ highest rated series, Celebrity Ghost Stories and the hit series, Celebrity Close Calls.

In the scripted world, Valen has partnered with VH1, ABC, FOX Television and Emmy award winning producer, Tony To. Valen is in development and is a Co-Executive Producer on ACTION HEROES INC. for ABC/Fox Studios. The action-comedy movie franchise stars William Shatner, Robert Wagner and Lee Majors as three former TV heroes turned real life detectives.

Filmography

Film

Television

References

External links

Actresses from Florida
Female models from New York (state)
American film actresses
American soap opera actresses
American television actresses
Television producers from New York City
American women television producers
Living people
Hallandale High School alumni
People from Hallandale Beach, Florida
Female models from Florida
20th-century American actresses
21st-century American actresses
People from Brooklyn
Actresses from New York City
Models from New York City
Broward College alumni
Television producers from Florida
Year of birth missing (living people)